Khliehriat is one of the 60 Legislative Assembly constituencies of Meghalaya state in India. It is part of East Jaintia Hills district and is reserved for candidates belonging to the Scheduled Tribes. It falls under Shillong Lok Sabha constituency and its current MLA is Kyrmen Shylla of United Democratic Party.

Member of Legislative Assembly
The list of MLAs are given below

|-style="background:#E9E9E9;"
!Year
!align="center" |Name
!colspan="2" align="center"|Party
|-
|2013
| Justine Dkhar  
|
|-
|2018
| rowspan=2|Kyrmen Shylla
|
|-
|2023
|-
|}

Election results

2023

2018

See also
List of constituencies of the Meghalaya Legislative Assembly
Khliehriat
East Jaintia Hills district
Shillong (Lok Sabha constituency)

References

Assembly constituencies of Meghalaya
East Jaintia Hills district